Thrincophora ostracopis is a moth of the family Tortricidae first described by Edward Meyrick in 1938. It is found on Seram and on New Guinea, where it has been recorded from Papua north-west New Guinea. The habitat consists of lower montane forests.

References

Moths described in 1938
Archipini